Owenia  is a genus of marine polychaete worms in the family Oweniidae.

Species by the WoRMS 

 Owenia artifex Verrill, 1885
 Owenia assimilator Caullery, 1944
 Owenia assimilis Sars, 1851
 Owenia australis Ford & Hutchings, 2005
 Owenia bassensis Ford & Hutchings, 2005
 Owenia borealis Koh, Bhaud & Jirkov, 2003
 Owenia caissara Silva & Lana, 2017
 Owenia caudisetosa Hartmann-Schröder, 1959
 Owenia collaris Hartman, 1955
 Owenia dichotoma Parapar & Moreira, 2015
 Owenia fusiformis Delle Chiaje, 1844
 Owenia gomsoni Koh & Bhaud, 2001
 Owenia johnsoni Blake, 2000
 Owenia mirrawa Ford & Hutchings, 2005
 Owenia persica Martin, Koh, Bhaud, Dutrieux & Gil, 2006
 Owenia petersenae Koh & Bhaud, 2003
 Owenia picta Parapar & Moreira, 2015
 Owenia polaris Koh, Bhaud & Jirkov, 2003

References

Sabellida